It's My Party is a 1996 American drama film written and directed by Randal Kleiser, it was one of the first feature films to address the topic of AIDS patients dying with dignity. The film is based on the true events of the death of Harry Stein, accomplished architect and designer, who was actually director Kleiser's ex-lover. Stein's actual farewell party was held in 1992.

The cast includes Olivia Newton-John, Margaret Cho, Bronson Pinchot, Devon Gummersall, George Segal, Lee Grant, Marlee Matlin, Roddy McDowall, Steve Antin, Bruce Davison, Sally Kellerman, Lou Liberatore, Nina Foch, Eric Roberts as Nick Stark and Gregory Harrison as Brandon, Stark's estranged lover who returns to attend the party and say goodbye. Kleiser directed Newton-John in Grease almost 20 years earlier.

Plot
It's My Party chronicles a two-day party hosted by Nick Stark (Eric Roberts) a gay architect who, having been diagnosed with progressive multifocal leukoencephalopathy, will fall into a state of mental lapse lasting for months until his death. He decides to host a party for his family and friends, at the end of which he will commit suicide by taking Seconal.

"You won't leave me, will you?" Nick asks his estranged lover, Brandon Theis (Gregory Harrison) a B movie director, shortly after revealing to him the results of his last blood test for HIV. "I don't want to die alone." In spite of Brandon's protestations, the two soon find the love they had shared for many years in ruins. One year after their breakup, Nick is confronted with a ravaged immune system and a CT Scan and lab values which, along with his worsening forgetfulness, clinches the diagnosis of Progressive multifocal leukoencephalopathy (PML) -- a condition he has seen claim his friends and one which he vows will not take him. Due to the aggressive nature of the disease, he has only a few days of conscious life remaining. His plan, he announces to family and "extended family," is to voluntarily end his life himself before the disease renders him unrecognizable to those he loves and he, in turn, is unable to recognize them. Uninvited to the farewell party, Brandon's presence is greeted with jeers from those who see him as having abandoned Nick in his time of greatest need.

Cast 
 Eric Roberts as Nick Stark
 Margaret Cho as Charlene Lee
 Lee Grant as Amalia Stark
 Bruce Davison as Rodney Bingham
 Olivia Newton-John as Lina Bingham
 Devon Gummersall as Andrew Bingham
 George Segal as Paul Stark
 Marlee Matlin as Daphne Stark
 Gregory Harrison as Brandon Theis
 Bronson Pinchot as Monty Tipton
 Roddy McDowall as Damian Knowles
 Steve Antin as Zack Phillips
 Sally Kellerman as Sara Hart
 Lou Liberatore as Joel Ferris
 Nina Foch as Mrs. Theis
 Christopher Atkins as Jack Allen
 Dennis Christopher as Douglas Reedy
 Ron Glass as Dr. David Wahl
 Paul Regina as Tony Zamara
 Dimitra Arliss as Fanny Kondons
 Cassandra Peterson (uncredited) as Party guest
 Joey Cramer (uncredited) as Party guest

Reception

Critical response
On Rotten Tomatoes, the film has an approval rating of 50% based on 16 reviews, with an average rating of 5.7/10.

Roger Ebert of the Chicago Sun-Times gave the film 3 out of 4 stars.

Box office
It's My Party opened in 28 theaters on March 22, 1996 with $148,532. The film would eventually gross $622,503 domestically.

Home media
A DVD with several special features was released in 2003. It contains deleted and extended scenes, featurettes on the making of the film and audio commentary by the director and some of the actors.

See also
 1996 in film
 List of films featuring the deaf and hard of hearing

References

External links
 
 
 

1996 films
1996 drama films
1996 LGBT-related films
American drama films
American LGBT-related films
Films scored by Basil Poledouris
Films directed by Randal Kleiser
HIV/AIDS in American films
Films about suicide
LGBT-related films based on actual events
United Artists films
1990s English-language films
1990s American films